Family Business is a compilation album by southern rappers E.S.G., Carmen Sandiego & Brandon Stacks, released in 2005.

Track listing
 "60 Bars"
 "You Don't Know E"
 "Bosses"
 "Roll  Call"
 "I Done Made It"
 "Back Streets"
 "By My Side"
 "Fuck Y'all"
 "How Ses Do"
 "Ride With Us"
 "Where Da Love"
 "On My Own"
 "Down South"
 "Fuck With Me"
 "32"
 "Getcha Grind On"
 "On Lock
 "Goin' Down Tonight"
 "Now You Callin'"
 "Sprung"

2005 compilation albums
E.S.G. (rapper) albums